Louise Allbritton (July 3, 1920 – February 16, 1979) was an American film and stage actress born in Oklahoma City, Oklahoma. Her name was sometimes seen as Louise Albritton.

She played in such films as Pittsburgh (1942), Who Done It? (1942), Son of Dracula (1943), The Egg and I (1947), and Sitting Pretty (1948).

Early life and career
Allbritton was born in Oklahoma City on  July 3, 1920, the daughter of E.E. Allbritton of Wichita Falls, Texas. She attended the University of Oklahoma and gained acting experience in the Pasadena Playhouse. Her father cut off her allowance in hopes that she would return home, but her contract with Universal Studios enabled her to continue in Hollywood.

During World War II, Allbritton performed overseas with a USO troupe, a group that "[g]ave show after show, many of them to the accompaniment of the thunder of enemy guns."

She was one of several replacements for the leading female role in the long-running Broadway production of The Seven Year Itch. On television, she played the title role in the NBC-TV series Concerning Miss Marlowe (1954) and co-starred in the CBS drama Stage Door (1950).

Personal life

She was married to CBS news correspondent and author Charles Collingwood from 1946 until her death and retired several years after their marriage.

Death
Allbritton died of cancer on February 16, 1979, in Puerto Vallarta, Mexico, where she and Collingwood had one of their homes.

Complete filmography

Not a Ladies' Man (1942) - Ethel Burlridge
Danger in the Pacific (1942) - Jane Claymore
Parachute Nurse (1942) - Helen Ames
Keeping Fit (1942, Short) - Miss Allbritton
Who Done It? (1942) - Miss Allbritton
Pittsburgh (1942) - Shannon Prentiss
It Comes Up Love (1943) - Edie Ives
Good Morning, Judge (1943) - Elizabeth Christine Smith
Fired Wife (1943) - Tahitha 'Tig' Callahan Dunne
Crazy House (1943) - Louise Allbritton (uncredited)
Son of Dracula (1943) - Katherine Caldwell
Her Primitive Man (1944) - Sheila Winthrop
Follow the Boys (1944) - Herself (uncredited)
This Is the Life (1944) - Harriet West Jarrett
San Diego, I Love You (1944) - Virginia McCooley
Bowery to Broadway (1944) - Lillian Russell
Men in Her Diary (1945) - Isabel Glenning
That Night with You (1945) - Sheila Morgan
Tangier (1946) - Dolores
The Egg and I (1947) - Harriet Putnam
Sitting Pretty (1948) - Edna Philby
Walk a Crooked Mile (1948) - Dr. Toni Neva
An Innocent Affair (1948) - Margot Fraser
The Doolins of Oklahoma (1949) - Rose of Cimarron
Felicia (1964) - Felicia (final film role)

Radio appearances

References

External links

 
Louise Allbritton and Charles Collingwood papers, circa 1917-1960 Billy Rose Theatre Division, The New York Public Library.

1920 births
1979 deaths
Deaths from spinal cancer
American film actresses
20th-century American actresses
American stage actresses
Actresses from Oklahoma City
Actresses from Oklahoma
American television actresses
Deaths from cancer in Mexico
Neurological disease deaths in Mexico
Universal Pictures contract players
American expatriates in Mexico